Knockalongy is a 544 m (1,785 ft) Marilyn in County Sligo, Ireland. It is the highest of the Ox Mountains. The nearest village is Skreen.

There are many megalithic tombs on the plain between Knockalongy and Sligo Bay to the north. There are also two small loughs at the foot of the mountain—Lough Aghree and Lough Minnaun.

See also
List of mountains in Ireland

References

Marilyns of Ireland
Mountains and hills of County Sligo